North Valmy Generating Station is a  coal-fired power station located near Valmy, Nevada.  The plant is jointly owned by NV Energy and Idaho Power.

Coal is delivered to the location by the Union Pacific Railroad and originates in Utah and Wyoming.

Description
The North Valmy Generating Station is a  coal-fueled, steam-electric generating plant with two operating units. This station can be seen from Highway 80 in Golconda, NV. When It is run at high capacity it burns through over one hundred rail cars of coal per day.

History
Construction was begun in 1979 by Sierra Pacific Resources on the plant.
The second unit followed in 1985 and is rated at with a Foster Wheeler Boiler and General Electric turbine/generator.

By 2012, it was anticipated that unit 1 will be taken out of service in 2022 and unit 2 by 2025. The owners plan 600 MW solar with 480 MW storage as partial substitutes, the plan for which was approved in January 2022. The two hybrid solar projects are expected to be completed in 2024.

Notes

Energy infrastructure completed in 1981
Energy infrastructure completed in 1985
Buildings and structures in Humboldt County, Nevada
Coal-fired power stations in Nevada
Idaho Power